Cryptocarya corrugata is a species of tree in the family Lauraceae. Found in tropical rainforest in Queensland in Australia, this species may grow to 35 metres tall. It was collected by William Francis west of Mackay in the Eungella range in 1922. The fruit is eaten by cassowaries and fruit pigeons.

References 

corrugata
Plants described in 1926
Flora of Queensland